Mario Benetton (born 1 January 1974) is an Italian former track cyclist. He won the team pursuit, at the 1997 UCI Track Cycling World Championships. He also competed at the 2000 Summer Olympics.

Major results

1997
 1st  Team pursuit, UCI World Track Championships
 1st Stage 6 Paths of King Nikola
 World Cup Classics
3rd Team pursuit, Quatro Sant'Elana
1998
 3rd  Team pursuit, UCI World Track Championships (with Andrea Collinelli, Adler Capelli & Cristiano Citton)
 World Cup Classics
1st Team pursuit, Hyères
1999
 World Cup Classics
3rd Team pursuit, Valencia
2000
 World Cup Classics
1st Team pursuit, Mexico City

References

External links
 
 

1974 births
Living people
Italian male cyclists
Cyclists at the 2000 Summer Olympics
Olympic cyclists of Italy
UCI Track Cycling World Champions (men)
Sportspeople from Padua
Italian track cyclists
Cyclists from the Province of Padua